Akiba  is a Japanese surname. Notable people with the surname include:

, Japanese politician
, Japanese footballer
, Japanese footballer
, Japanese footballer
, Japanese footballer and manager
, Japanese politician
, Japanese ice hockey player
, Japanese footballer

Other people
David Akiba (born 1940), American photographer

Fictional characters
Hiroshi Akiba, character in the manga series Inubaka: Crazy for Dogs

Japanese-language surnames